Diawandou Diagne Niang (born 28 July 1994) is a Senegalese footballer who plays as a defensive midfielder.

Club career

Early career
Born in Thiès, Diagne joined ASPIRE Academy in February 2008, aged 13, after being selected as one of the three Senegalese players to join the Qatari club's youth setup. He was one of the final 24 players selected, after competing with other 430,000.

Eupen
On 6 June 2012, Diagne joined Belgian Second Division side Eupen. He played his first match as a professional on 23 August, starting in a 1–0 home win against Dessel Sport.

Diagne finished his debut season with 32 league appearances (all starts, 2790 minutes of action). On 18 May 2014 he scored his first goal, netting his side's second in a 2–2 home draw against Sint-Truidense.

Barcelona
On 7 July 2014, Diagne signed a three-year deal with FC Barcelona B. He made his debut for the club on 23 August, starting in a 0–2 away loss against CA Osasuna in the Segunda División championship.

On 16 December 2014 Diagne was called up to the main squad for a Copa del Rey match against SD Huesca, but remained unused in the 8–1 home routing.

Odisha
On 8 June 2019, Diagne joined the Indian Super League side Delhi Dynamos (now Odisha FC), for the 2019–20 season on a free transfer.

International career
After appearing with the under-17 and under-20s, Diagne made his main squad debut on 31 May 2014, starting and playing the full 90 minutes in a 2–2 draw against Colombia at the Estadio Pedro Bidegain.

Club statistics

International statistics

References

External links
 Eupen official profile 
 
 

1994 births
Living people
Sportspeople from Thiès
Senegalese footballers
Association football defenders
K.A.S. Eupen players
FC Barcelona Atlètic players
Belgian Pro League players
Challenger Pro League players
Senegalese expatriate footballers
Senegalese expatriate sportspeople in Belgium
Expatriate footballers in Belgium
Senegalese expatriate sportspeople in Spain
Expatriate footballers in Spain
Senegal international footballers
Expatriate footballers in Qatar
Senegalese expatriate sportspeople in Qatar